Barrand is a French surname.  People with the name include:

 Sarah Barrand (born 1985), an English actress
 Tony Barrand (born 1940s in England), an academic and musician 
 Arthur Rhys Barrand (1861–1941) was a British Liberal Party politician, Member of Parliament 1918–1922